The Tamsui Church is a church in Tamsui District, New Taipei, Taiwan.

History
The current Tamsui Church building was built by Japan. It was then renovated in 1932 due to deterioration and opened by the son of George Leslie Mackay on 28 November 1933. The building was again renovated in 1986.

Architecture

The Tamsui church chapel is a Gothic building, and the clock tower is one of its features. This clock has existed since the completion of the "White Chapel" in 1915. There is no earlier information, only the clock face is cast with "YORK" and "No. 30" et al. Made in the USA.

The sound of this bell is loud and round, and it can be heard even miles away from the coast. The famous Taiwanese ballad "Twilight Song of Tamsui" mentions that "the church bell rings to the sea with an empty heart".

During World War II, this clock was requisitioned by the Japanese government as a siren for the "Street Workplace", and it was erected on the roof of the "Daguanlou" (Red Building). It burst and lost its sound when it was bombed in an air raid, and finally dedicated itself to the residents of Tamsui. The bell was sent back to the church after the war. In 1985, it was installed at the back of the chapel to commemorate it, named "Gospel Bell".

Transportation
The church is accessible within walking distance north west of Tamsui Station of Taipei Metro.

See also
 List of tourist attractions in Taiwan
 Christianity in Taiwan

References

1933 establishments in Taiwan
Buildings and structures completed in 1933
Churches in Taiwan
Religious buildings and structures in New Taipei